Škamevec is a settlement in the hills northwest of Rašica in the Municipality of Velike Lašče in central Slovenia. The entire municipality was traditionally part of the Lower Carniola region and is now included in the Central Slovenia Statistical Region.

References

External links
Škamevec on Geopedia

Populated places in the Municipality of Velike Lašče